Hanmer can refer to:

People
 David Hanmer, 14th century English judge
 Lee F. Hanmer, social worker
 Margaret Hanmer, Owain Glyndwr's wife
 Paul Hanmer, South African composer and pianist
 Ronald Hanmer, composer
 Sir Thomas Hanmer, 2nd Baronet (1612–78), second baronet of Hanmer, Flintshire
 Sir Thomas Hanmer, 2nd Baronet (1747–1828) of the second creation
 Sir Thomas Hanmer, 4th Baronet, fourth baronet of Hanmer, Flintshire and Speaker of the House of Commons

Titles
 Hanmer baronets

Places
 Hanmer, Ontario, Canada
 Hanmer, Wrexham, Wales
 Hanmer Mere
 Hanmer Springs in New Zealand
 Hanmer Springs Ski Area